Over the Rooftops is the first album by Sevenglory. It was released on 1 March 2006 through 7Spin Music.

Track listing
"More Now" – 3:41
"Really Free" – 4:32
"This Time" – 4:32
"Waiting For You" – 3:53
"Over The Rooftops" – 3:39
"Big Top" – 3:18
"Fall Apart" – 3:21
"Track 7" – 3:53
"Love You Forever" – 4:56
"Ever Be Enough" – 4:32

Personnel 
Fred Butson – lead vocals, guitar
Gabe Johannes – drums
Caleb Johannes – bass
Kyle Sebestyen – guitar

2007 albums
Sevenglory albums